Béla Vágó (born Béla Weiss; 9 August 1881 in Kecskemét – 10 March 1939) was a Hungarian communist politician, who served as de facto Interior Minister with Jenő Landler during the Hungarian Soviet Republic. After the fall of the communist regime, he emigrated to the Soviet Union.

Death
He was arrested on 28 February 1939 on fabricated charges (espionage, counter-revolutionary activity), then sentenced to death on 10 March; the sentence being executed that day. He was buried in the Donskoye Cemetery, Common Grave No. 1. He was rehabilitated on 25 February 1956.

References

 Magyar Életrajzi Lexikon

1881 births
1939 deaths
People from Kecskemét
Jewish Hungarian politicians
Jewish socialists
Social Democratic Party of Hungary politicians
Hungarian Interior Ministers
Hungarian emigrants to the Soviet Union
People granted political asylum in the Soviet Union
Jews executed by the Soviet Union
Great Purge victims from Hungary
Executed communists

Soviet rehabilitations